Valentín Haberkon (born 29 July 1995) is an Argentine professional footballer who plays as a forward for Puteolana.

Career
Haberkon played in the youth of Independiente and Banfield. In July 2017, Haberkon joined Deportivo Español of Primera B Metropolitana. His senior debut arrived in the following September in a three-goal win away to Colegiales on 9 September, which was followed by eighteen more appearances in 2017–18. He scored his first goal in his second game of 2018–19, netting in a fixture with San Miguel on 2 September 2018. Haberkon scored further versus Fénix, Almirante Brown and Defensores Unidos in the next months, before netting against the latter again in April as his club were relegated to Primera C Metropolitana.

Haberkon spent the 2019–20 campaign in Primera B Metropolitana with Los Andes, making nine appearances and scoring one goal; against San Telmo. On 2 October 2020, Haberkon headed abroad to join Romanian Liga II club FK Csíkszereda. He made his debut during a 2–1 defeat away to FC Metaloglobus București on 24 October, after he replaced András Mészáros during the interval.

Career statistics
.

References

External links

1995 births
Living people
Argentine footballers
Argentine expatriate footballers
People from Macachín
Association football forwards
Argentine people of Volga German descent
Primera B Metropolitana players
Liga II players
Serie D players
Deportivo Español footballers
Club Atlético Los Andes footballers
FK Csíkszereda Miercurea Ciuc players
Pol. Olympia Agnonese players
F.C. Rieti players
Vigor Lamezia players
F.C. Lamezia Terme players
S.S.D. Puteolana 1902 Internapoli players
Argentine expatriate sportspeople in Romania
Argentine expatriate sportspeople in Italy
Expatriate footballers in Romania
Expatriate footballers in Italy